Filodrillia is a genus of sea snails, marine gastropod mollusks in the family Borsoniidae, the cone snails and their allies.

Description
Filodrillia is a genus from deep water which resembles Etrema in the form of the sinus, but not of the protoconch, but differs in the thin slender shell, turreted whorls, absence of ribs and varix. The spiral sculpture predominates.

Distribution
This marine genus is endemic to Australia and occurs off New South Wales, South Australia, Tasmania and Victoria.

Species
Species within the genus Filodrillia include:
 Filodrillia aikeni Stahlschmidt, 2015
 Filodrillia angulifera Cotton, 1947
 Filodrillia columnaria Hedley, 1922
 Filodrillia crebrespirata (Verco, 1909)
 Filodrillia delicatula Laseron, 1954
 Filodrillia dolorosa (Thiele, 1925)
 Filodrillia dulcis (G. B. Sowerby III, 1896)
 Filodrillia haswelli (Hedley, 1907)
 Filodrillia lacteola (Verco, 1909)
 Filodrillia mucronata Hedley, 1922
 Filodrillia ordinata Laseron, 1954
 Filodrillia ornata Hedley, 1922
 Filodrillia pergradata Cotton, 1947
 Filodrillia stadialis Hedley, 1922
 Filodrillia teres Laseron, 1954
 Filodrillia thornleyana Laseron, 1954
 Filodrillia tricarinata (Tenison-Woods, 1878)
 Filodrillia trophonoides (Verco, 1909)
 Filodrillia vitrea Laseron, 1954
Species brought into synonymy
 Filodrillia recta (Hedley, 1903): synonym of Austrocarina recta (Hedley, 1903) 
 † Filodrillia rupta Marwick, 1931: synonym of † Drilliola rupta (Marwick, 1931) (original combination)
 Filodrillia steira Hedley, 1922: synonym of Austroturris steira (Hedley, 1922)
 †Filodrillia studiosorum L. C. King, 1933 : synonym of  † Maoritomella studiosorum (L. C. King, 1933)  (original combination)
 † Filodrillia torquatella Marwick, 1931 : synonym of  † Maoritomella torquatella (Marwick, 1931) (original combination)

References

 Hedley, C. 1922. A revision of the Australian Turridae. Records of the Australian Museum 13(6): 213-359, pls 42-56
 Taylor, J.D., Kantor, Y.I. & Sysoev, A.V. 1993. Foregut anatomy, feeding mechanisms, relationships and classification of the Conoidea (=Toxoglossa) (Gastropoda). Bulletin of the British Museum (Natural History) Zoology 59: 125-170 
 Bouchet, P.; Kantor, Y. I.; Sysoev, A.; Puillandre, N. (2011). A new operational classification of the Conoidea. Journal of Molluscan Studies. 77, 273-308

External links

 
Gastropods of Australia
Gastropod genera